Karel Gut (16 September 1927 – 6 January 2014) was a Czech ice hockey player and coach, who later worked in sports management. He was born in Prague and later played in the Czechoslovak Extraliga. While Gut played soccer in his youth, he was better known as an, "offensive-minded hockey defenseman".

Gut was inducted into the International Ice Hockey Federation Hall of Fame in 1998, and has also been inducted into the Czechoslovakian Ice Hockey Hall of Fame. He died on January 6, 2014, at the age of 86.

Playing career
Born in Prague, Czechoslovakia, Gut eventually began playing in the Czechoslovak Extraliga with Praha ATK. He later played for  Tatra Smichov from 1951 to 1953. He would play the rest of his career with Spartak Praha Sokolova TJ. Gut also captained the Czechoslovakia men's national ice hockey team from 1952 to 1960.

As a player, he won three bronze medals at the Ice Hockey World Championships, first in 1955 where he was voted the tournament's best defenseman, then again in 1957 and in 1959. Gut also made three appearances at the Winter Olympics, and six World Cup appearances.

Coaching career
In 1964 he retired from his playing career in ice hockey and became an ice hockey coach.

Between 1973 and 1979 Gut was the coach for the then Czechoslovakia men's national ice hockey team who he lead on to win the gold at the Ice Hockey World Championships in 1976 in Poland and 1977 in Austria.

In the late 1970s, after having observed Roger Neilson of the Toronto Maple Leafs using ringette rings and concepts during a practice in Canada, Gut went back to Czechoslovakia and introduced and modified these ideas and applied them to the training system for the national mens team's practices, which was then also applied as a training aid for Czechoslovakia's university ice hockey teams.

Management career
When Czechoslovakia was divided, Gut became chairman of the Czech Ice Hockey Association. The team went on to take the gold medal at the 1998 Winter Olympics in Japan and won four VM-Gold in 1996, 1999, 2000 and 2001.

References

External links

IIHF Hockey Hall of Fame bio

1927 births
2014 deaths
Czechoslovak ice hockey coaches
Czechoslovakia men's national ice hockey team coaches
Ice hockey people from Prague
Ice hockey players at the 1952 Winter Olympics
Ice hockey players at the 1956 Winter Olympics
Ice hockey players at the 1960 Winter Olympics
IIHF Hall of Fame inductees
Olympic ice hockey players of Czechoslovakia
Czechoslovak ice hockey defencemen
Czech ice hockey defencemen
Czech ice hockey coaches
Czechoslovak expatriate sportspeople in West Germany
Czechoslovak expatriate ice hockey people